E. Thomas is an Italian fabric mill established  in Brusimpiano in 1922 by Ernesto Thomas. The mill's fabrics include a range of blends combining wool with silk, Chinese and Mongolian cashmere, mohair and linen.  The mill is located on the Italian shore of Lake Lugano.

Clients
Club Monaco's head of menswear, Aaron Levine, chose E. Thomas fabric for the brand's Grant suit.

Hickey Freeman uses E. Thomas fabric for some of their garments.

SuitSupply uses E. Thomas fabric for some of their suits and blazers.

See also
Ermenegildo Zegna
Loro Piana
Dormeuil
Holland & Sherry
Carlo Barbera
Drago (fabric mill)
Cerruti

References

1922 establishments in Italy
Companies of Italy
Textile companies of Italy
High fashion brands
Luxury brands